The Communist Party of Vietnam is organized according to the Leninist principle of Democratic centralism.

The supreme party organ is the National Congress, which has been held every five years since . Due to war footing during the time of wars against France and the United States, the first four congresses were not fixed according to a common time schedule. Since the Foundation Conference, 12 national CPV congresses have been held.

The National Congress elects the Central Committee, consisting of 180 full members and 20 alternates. The Central Committee usually meets twice a year.

Keys

Convocations

References

Bibliography

.0
Politics of Vietnam
Vietnam politics-related lists
Vietnam, Communist Party